Justice Patten may refer to:

George Y. Patten (1876–1951), associate justice of the Montana Supreme Court
Nicholas Patten (born 1950), member of the Court of Appeal of England and Wales